Juries Act (with its variations) is a stock short title used for legislation in the United Kingdom relating to juries.

List
The Juries Act 1974

The Juries Acts 1825 to 1870 was the collective title of the following Acts:
The Juries Act 1825 (6 Geo 4 c 50)
The Juries Act 1862 (25 & 26 Vict c 107)
The Juries Act 1870 (33 & 34 Vict c 77)

The Juries (Scotland) Acts 1745 to 1869 is the collective title of the following Acts:
The Jurors (Scotland) Act 1745 (19 Geo 2 9)
The Jurors (Scotland) Act 1825 (6 Geo 4 c 22)
The Jurors (Scotland) Act 1826 (7 Geo 4 c 8)
The Juries (Lighthouse Keepers Exemption) Act 1869 (32 & 33 Vict c 36)

The Juries (Ireland) Acts 1871 to 1894 is the collective title of the following Acts:
The Juries Act (Ireland) 1871 (34 & 35 Vict c 65)
The Juries (Ireland) Act 1872 (35 & 36 Vict c 25)
The Jurors Qualification (Ireland) Act 1876 (39 & 40 Vict c 21)
The Juries Procedure (Ireland) Act 1876 (39 & 40 Vict c 78)
The Jurors (Ireland) Act 1894 (57 & 58 Vict c 49)

The Grand Juries (Ireland) Acts 1816 to 1895 is the collective title of the following Acts:
The Grand Juries (Ireland) Act 1816 (56 Geo 3 c 87)
The Grand Jury (Ireland) Act 1833 (3 & 4 Will 4 c 78)
The Grand Jury (Ireland) Act 1836 (6 & 7 Will 4 c 116)
The Grand Jury (Ireland) Act 1837 (7 Will 4 & 1 Vict c 2)
The Grand Jury (Ireland) Act 1838 (1 & 2 Vict c 37)
The Grand Jury (Ireland) Act 1843 (6 & 7 Vict c 32)
The County Dublin Grand Jury Act 1844 (7 & 8 Vict c 106)
The Grand Jury (Dublin) Act 1845 (8 & 9 Vict c 81)
The Grand Jury (Ireland) Act 1853 (16 & 17 Vict c 136)
The Grand Jury (Ireland) Act 1856 (19 & 20 Vict c 63)
The Grand Juries (Ireland) Act 1857 (20 & 21 Vict c 15)
The Grand Juries (Ireland) Act 1872 (35 & 36 Vict c 42)
The Grand Juries (Ireland) Act 1873 (36 & 37 Vict c 34)
The Queen's Bench (Ireland) Grand Juries Act 1873 (36 & 37 Vict c 65)
The Grand Jury (Ireland) Act 1895 (58 & 59 Vict c 8)

See also
List of short titles

References

Lists of legislation by short title and collective title